Binnion may refer to:
Binnion (hill), a classification of Irish hill

People with the surname
Benny Binion (1904-1989), American gambler and mobster
Travis Binnion (born 1986), English footballer

See also
Battle of Binnion Hill